Medal for Soldier's Virtue is a Medal of Republika Srpska. It was established in 1993 by the Constitution of Republika Srpska and 'Law on orders and awards' valid since 28 April 1993.

The Medal for Military Merit has one class and is awarded is awarded to members of the Army of Republika Srpska for exemplary conduct, knowledge and performance of military duties.

The inscription on the medal reads: For military virtues, Republika Srpska.

See also 
 Orders, decorations and medals of Republika Srpska

References

Orders, decorations, and medals of Republic of Srpska
Awards established in 1993